German DJ Felix Jaehn has released two studio albums, one extended play, one remix album, one DJ mix, and thirty-one singles.

Albums

Studio albums

Remix albums
 I Remixed (2018)

DJ mixes

Extended plays

Singles

Remixes

As Eff

Notes

References

Discographies of German artists
Electronic music discographies